State Street Historic District is a national historic district located at Carthage in Jefferson County, New York.  The district includes 26 contributing buildings.  They are attached brick commercial buildings built between 1860 and 1900 in a variety of styles.

It was listed on the National Register of Historic Places in 1983.

Gallery

References

Commercial buildings on the National Register of Historic Places in New York (state)
Historic districts on the National Register of Historic Places in New York (state)
Historic districts in Jefferson County, New York
National Register of Historic Places in Jefferson County, New York